Pomigliano d'Arco is a municipality in the Metropolitan City of Naples in Italy, located north of Mount Vesuvius.

It is known for its industrial pole among the largest and most influential in southern Italy. In the industrial area there is, among others, the  Gian Battista Vico factory of Fiat Chrysler Automobiles, the center Elasis (also Fiat), the Alenia Aermacchi and Avio  plants, as well as having hosted the first airport of Campania in the 1960s.

History
During World War II, Pomigliano was the location of a large military airfield and base, and was attacked on several occasions by the United States Army Air Forces.  The airfield was later used by the RAF and the USAAF Twelfth Air Force during the Italian campaign and known as RAF Pomigliano and Pomigliano Airfield.

References

General references
 Maurer, Maurer. Air Force Combat Units of World War II. Maxwell AFB, Alabama: Office of Air Force History, 1983. .

Inline citations

External links

 
Official site of the International Jazz Festival of Pomigliano d'Arco
Visit Figli Di Pomigliano D'Arco, a non-profit organization that was established in 2007.